The Miller Analogies Test (MAT) is a standardized test used both for graduate school admissions in the United States and entrance to high I.Q. societies. Created and still published by Harcourt Assessment (now a division of Pearson Education), the MAT consists of 120 questions in 60 minutes (formerly 100 questions in 50 minutes).  Unlike other graduate school admissions exams such as the GRE, the Miller Analogies Test is verbal or computer based.

Content and use
The test aims to measure an individual's logical and analytical reasoning through the use of partial analogies.  A sample test question might be

Bach : Composing :: Monet :

a. painting
b. composing
c. writing
d. orating

This should be read as "Bach is to  Composing as  Monet is to  ___." The answer would be a. painting because just as Bach is most known for composing music, Monet is most known for his painting. The open slot may appear in any of the four positions.

Unlike analogies found on past editions of the GRE and the SAT, the MAT's analogies demand a broad knowledge of Western culture, testing subjects such as science, music, literature, philosophy, mathematics, art, and history.  Thus, exemplary success on the MAT requires more than a nuanced and cultivated vocabulary.

Format and scoring
In the fall of 2004, the exam became computerized; the MAT is now solely a computer-based test (CBT).

Out of the 120 questions, only 100 count in the test-taker's score.  The remaining 20 questions are experimental.  There is no way for test-takers to identify any of the 20 experimental questions on a given test form, as the two types of questions are intermingled.

Tests taken before October 2004 were scored simply by the number of questions the test-taker answered correctly, with a range from 0-100. Scores using this metric have historically been known as "raw" scores.

Tests taken in October 2004 or later have a score range from 200 to 600.  The median score is 400, with a standard deviation of 25 points. These scores, based on a normal curve, are known as "scaled" scores.  Because of their grounding in this model, scaled MAT scores of 500-600 are extremely rare, as they would be more than four standard deviations above the norm of 400.

Percentile ranks are also provided along with the official score report.  Test-takers receive an overall percentile rank as well as a percentile rank within their intended graduate school discipline.

The Miller Analogies Test used to be accepted by American Mensa, and still is by Intertel, the Triple Nine Society, the International Society for Philosophical Enquiry and the Prometheus Society for its admission requirements. Intertel requires a raw score of 74 on the "old" MAT, or a score at the 99th percentile on the modern one. The ISPE and the Triple Nine Society require at least a raw score of 85 on the "old" MAT, and at least 472 on the modern one. The Prometheus Society requires at least a raw score of 98 on the "old" MAT, and at least 500 on the modern one.

Validity

Kuncel and colleagues investigated the predictive validity of the MAT in both academic and occupational settings. Their meta-analytic study indicated that the MAT is a valid predictor in both domains and that it measures the same abilities as other cognitive ability instruments. Selected validity coefficients from the study are presented in the table below.

Criticism

According to Kaplan & Saccuzo, the Miller Analogies Test is age-biased.  The scores over-predict the GPAs (Grade Point Average) of people ages 25 to 34 and achievement for people 45 and older, and under-predict the GPAs of people 35 to 44.

See also
Entrance examination
Graduate Record Examination

References

External links
Miller Analogies Homepage
Intertel Qualifying Scores including the MAT
Triple Nine Society Qualifying Scores including the MAT
ISPE Qualifying Scores including the MAT

Standardized tests in the United States
Intelligence tests